Ethan Ivan Thompson (born May 4, 1999) is a Puerto Rican-American professional basketball player for the Windy City Bulls of the NBA G League. He played college basketball for the Oregon State Beavers and represents the Puerto Rican national team.

High school career
Thompson played on Bishop Montgomery's varsity team for all 4 years during his high school career. As a senior at Bishop Montgomery he averaged 22.8 points, 7.7 rebounds, and  5.4 assists while also leading his team to the CIF Open Division State Championship. Bishop Montgomery beat Chino Hills, who were led by LaMelo Ball and his brother LiAngelo, in the regional semifinals, and beat Mater Dei in the regional final before beating Woodcreek to win the state title. Thompson participated in the Ballislife All-American Game on May 6, 2017. He led the game in scoring with 32 points on 14-of-18 shooting.

Recruiting
On November 9, 2016, Thompson signed his National Letter of Intent to play for Oregon State, as he quoted, "I chose to attend OSU because I was impressed with the basketball facility, the coaching staff and the character of my future teammates. The opportunity to contribute as a freshman was appealing to me."

College career

In his college debut against Southern Utah, Thompson scored 20 points, had 5 assists and grabbed 8 rebounds. On March 3, 2018, he scored a season-high 23 points in a 92–67 win over Washington State.

After his sophomore season, Thompson declared for the 2019 NBA draft. However, he withdrew from the draft on May 29, 2019 and returned to Oregon State for his junior season.

As a junior, Thompson started 31 games and finished second on the Beavers in scoring at 14.8 points a game, while leading the team in assists at 4.5 per game. Following the season, he declared for the 2020 NBA draft but did not hire an agent.

Professional career

Windy City Bulls (2021–present)
After going undrafted in the 2021 NBA draft, Thompson joined the Chicago Bulls for the 2021 NBA Summer League. On September 8, 2021, he signed with the Bulls, but was waived on October 11. Thompson joined the Windy City Bulls as an affiliate player.

National team career
Thompson played for Puerto Rico at the 2016 FIBA Americas Under-18 Championship. Thompson averaged 11.8 points, 6.2 rebounds and 1.8 assists per game in the tournament.

Career statistics

College

|-
| style="text-align:left;"| 2017–18
| style="text-align:left;"| Oregon State
| 32 || 32 || 32.2 || .383 || .333 || .731 || 4.1 || 3.5 || .7 || .4 || 9.9
|-
| style="text-align:left;"| 2018–19
| style="text-align:left;"| Oregon State
| 31 || 31 || 34.4 || .444 || .359 || .797 || 5.0 || 3.9 || .9 || .5 || 13.7
|-
| style="text-align:left;"| 2019–20
| style="text-align:left;"| Oregon State
| 31 || 31 || 35.4 || .458 || .333 || .742 || 4.2 || 4.5 || 1.3 || .2 || 14.8
|-
| style="text-align:left;"| 2020–21
| style="text-align:left;"| Oregon State
| 33 || 33 || 33.6 || .404 || .329 || .813 || 4.0 || 3.9 || 1.2 || .4 || 15.7
|- class="sortbottom"
| style="text-align:center;" colspan="2"| Career
| 127 || 127 || 33.9 || .424 || .338 || .776 || 4.3 || 3.9 || 1.0 || .3 || 13.5

Personal life
Thompson's father, Stephen, is an assistant coach for Oregon State basketball. Thompson's brother, Stephen Jr., played for Oregon State from 2015 to 2019.

References

External links
Oregon State Beavers bio

1999 births
Living people
American men's basketball players
Basketball players from Los Angeles
Oregon State Beavers men's basketball players
People from Harbor City, Los Angeles
Puerto Rican men's basketball players
Shooting guards
Windy City Bulls players